Grace Under Fire is an American sitcom that aired on ABC from September 29, 1993, to February 17, 1998. The show starred Brett Butler as a single mother learning how to cope with raising her three children alone after finally divorcing her abusive husband. The series was created by Chuck Lorre and produced by Carsey-Werner Productions.

Premise 
Grace Under Fire, produced by Carsey-Werner, was part of a wave of shows in the late 1980s and 1990s that were built around a comedian (and in some cases, closely based on his or her comedy routine). Many of Carsey-Werner's shows were based on nontraditional, non-nuclear families.

Grace Under Fire followed a similar formula, set in the small fictitious town of Victory, Missouri; Butler starred as Grace Kelly, a divorced single mother and recovering alcoholic. The show begins after the main character divorces her abusive alcoholic husband of eight years in an attempt to start life anew and prevent her children from making the same mistakes she did. The show revolved around Grace; her children, mischievous Quentin (Noah Segan, pilot; Jon Paul Steuer, seasons 1–3; Sam Horrigan, seasons 4–5), happy-go-lucky Libby (Kaitlin Cullum), and infant Patrick (Dylan and Cole Sprouse); her happily married best friends and neighbors, Nadine and Wade Swoboda (Julie White and Casey Sander); and the town's bachelor pharmacist, Russell Norton (Dave Thomas).

In the first three seasons Grace's chosen line of work, post-divorce was operating pipelines at the local oil refinery, where she had a second family of fellow crew workers. Among them were Dougie Boudreau (Walter Olkewicz),  Vic (Dave Florek), and Carl (Louis Mandylor). Their boss was Bill Davis (Charles Hallahan). Both Bill and Carl were dropped after the first season; while Carl had not had a permanent on-screen replacement, the crew's new boss was John Shirley (Paul Dooley) starting in the second season.

Russell's friendship with Grace, and their on-and-off dating rituals, became a running theme in the series. Throughout their friendship, they often dated other people; for a time in 1994, Grace dated Ryan Sparks (William Fichtner), a quirky chemist who worked in the oil refinery's labs. In season three, Grace entered into a relationship with suave plant executive Rick Bradshaw (Alan Autry). As with Ryan, the affair between Grace and Rick occurred despite their radically different places in the company ladder. They broke up at the end of season three, although Rick returned in season four to see if their romance could be rekindled.

In season four, Grace began taking college classes at night, paid for by her workplace. When the plant decided to stop funding her education about halfway through the season, Grace decided to quit the oil refinery and return to school full-time, as she only needed a few months of concentrated classes to graduate. The remainder of season four featured Grace as a full-time student, and towards the end of the season, she did, in fact, graduate. In the season finale, Grace took an entry-level position with an ad agency.

At the beginning of the fifth season Grace decided that the commute and long working hours at the ad agency were forcing her to spend almost all of her time away from her family. She quit the agency job, and began working in the administrative/business end of a construction company owned by D.C. (Don "D.C." Curry). Also in that season, Russell found some romantic interest in Dottie (Lauren Tom), a gossiping hairstylist who was also friends with Grace. Nadine after having given birth to her and Wade's long-awaited child, abruptly decided to leave Wade and move to Colorado.  It was explained that her character and her child had left, while Wade stayed behind. Actress Julie White had left the show between seasons four and five, and did not reprise her role in a guest capacity.

Throughout the entire five-year run, Grace's ex-husband Jimmy Kelly (Geoff Pierson) showed up, sometimes causing problems and at others miraculously clean and sober, trying to win Grace back. A reconciliation never quite happened, but the two did settle on a good friendship for the sake of the kids. Jimmy originally served as an off-screen character in season one, with Blake Clark occasionally portraying him in voice only. In the midst of Jimmy's attempts to become a better person, his father Emmett (guest star Matt Clark) was revealed to be gay, after Grace and Rick inadvertently visit a gay bar and run into him there during a road trip; following Emmett's sudden death midway through the third season, his sexuality and the same-sex affair he kept secret was revealed to the rest of his family during his funeral. At this time, Jimmy's mother Jean (Peggy Rea), Grace's disapproving and moralizing former mother-in-law, offered to move in and help Grace raise the kids. Rea had previously guest-starred as Jean periodically.

Russell reconciled with his estranged dad, Floyd (Tom Poston). By season three Floyd ended up moving in with Russell and working with him in the pharmacy. Grace had a regular source of support from her sister Faith (Valri Bromfield) in the first two seasons. Another development came when Grace was contacted by her first child, Matthew (guest star Tom Everett Scott), whom she gave up for adoption before meeting Jimmy. Matthew had questions about his ancestry and ended up meeting his biological father (guest star Barry Bostwick).

By the fifth season, Dot had replaced Nadine as Grace's friend and confidant, but abruptly stopped appearing on the show in early 1998 (though she was still mentioned). Instead, Grace's old friend Bev Henderson (Julia Duffy) came back to town and ended up moving in with the Kellys. Grace and Bev's personal reunion was the last major storyline of the series. Although she was joining the cast full-time, Duffy only appeared in two episodes of Grace Under Fire before the series was cancelled in mid-February 1998.

Cast

Main cast
 Brett Butler as Grace Burdette-Kelly
 Dave Thomas as Russell Norton
 Julie White as Nadine Swoboda (1993–1997)
 Casey Sander as Wade Swoboda
 Jon Paul Steuer as Quentin Kelly (1993–1996)
 Sam Horrigan as Quentin Kelly (1996–1998)
 Kaitlin Cullum as Elizabeth Louise "Libby" Kelly
 Dylan and Cole Sprouse as Patrick Kelly
 Charles Hallahan as Bill Davis (1993–1994)
 Walter Olkewicz as Dougie Boudreau (1993–1994; recurring, 1994–1996)
 Don "D.C." Curry as D.C. (1997–1998)
 Lauren Tom as Dot (1997–1998)

Recurring cast
 Tom Poston as Floyd Norton (1995–1998)
 Paul Dooley as John Shirley (1994–1996)
 Dave Florek as Vic (1993–1996)
 Alan Autry as Rick Bradshaw (1995–1996)
 Peggy Rea as Jean Kelly (1995–1998)
 Geoff Pierson as James "Jimmy" Kelly
 Louis Mandylor as Carl (1993–1994)
 Valri Bromfield as Faith Burdette (1993–1995)
 William Fichtner as Ryan Sparks (1994)
 Julia Duffy as Bev Henderson (1998)

Episodes

Grace Under Fire was the highest-rated new sitcom and freshman American television series of the 1993–94 season. One month before the series premiered, Showtime had broadcast the Carsey Werner-produced Brett Butler Special, a half-hour comedy performance by Butler.

"Viva Las Vegas"

The episode "Vega$" is part of a crossover with Coach, The Drew Carey Show and Ellen set in Las Vegas. It features Drew Carey as Drew Carey, Joely Fisher as Paige Clark, Jeremy Piven as Spence Kovak and Jerry Van Dyke as Luther Van Dam.

Production

Controversy and cancellation
As the third season concluded in the spring of 1996, Jon Paul Steuer left the series. Sources have speculated that Steuer's mother pulled him out of the show after an incident with Butler, who allegedly flashed her breasts at the 12-year-old actor. At the start of Season 4, Sam Horrigan became the third actor to play Quentin Kelly, and with him in the role, the character's age advanced to 15.

In the fourth and fifth seasons of the show, Butler was fighting a painkiller addiction, for which she eventually sought medical help. Cast member Julie White left the show after Season 4, also citing Butler's behavior as the reason. The show, which had been a Top 20 series for its first three seasons, began to take a significant drop in the ratings during season four, from 13th place to 45th.

Butler's first round of treatment and rehab delayed the start of the fifth season until November. After Grace Under Fire resumed production on season five, a newly clean Butler struggled to stay that way; morale on the set was little better than in the previous season because of the star's erratic behavior. Around the holidays, Butler relapsed again, and although the producers were as committed as ever to continuing the show, ABC was becoming concerned about Butler's overall health, and was less patient with her increasing frequency of missed tapings.

The show's ratings continued to fall dramatically, which may have well been attributed to Butler's reputation in the press, the longer-than-usual hiatus the series took between seasons four and five, and the fact that the character of Grace Kelly no longer went through the kinds of struggles that had made the show successful earlier on. The addition of Julia Duffy several episodes into the fifth season was a last-ditch attempt to improve the ratings, but with Butler in her current state, the network was not inspired to continue on. Rather abruptly, with the February 17, 1998, telecast, ABC canceled the series. The three-month-long final season averaged #68 in the 1997–98 Nielsen ratings.

Syndication
The series aired in syndication on the Oxygen Network in the United States. In the United Kingdom, the series was picked up by BBC2 where it aired from 1994 to 1999. The show was added to Hulu on March 1, 2014. Upon the network's April 15, 2015, launch, the series began airing on U.S. digital broadcast network Laff, which has carried Grace largely ever since. As of November 26, 2020, the entire series can be seen in Canada on Amazon Prime Video.

Awards and nominations
Grace Under Fire was nominated for three Golden Globe Awards: Best Performance by an Actress in a TV Series Comedy/Musical in 1995 and 1997 and Best TV Series Comedy/Musical in 1995.

Jean Stapleton was nominated for the 1995 Outstanding Guest Actress in a Comedy series Emmy Award for playing Aunt Vivian in the episode "The Road to Paris Texas." Diane Ladd was nominated for the same award the previous year for playing Louise Burdett in the episode entitled "Things Left Undone" written by Brett Butler and Wayne Lemon.

Home media
On May 4, 2015, it was announced that Visual Entertainment (VEI) had acquired the rights to the series in Region 1. Grace Under Fire: The Complete Collection was released on DVD on October 6, 2015.

International remakes
The show was remade in Russia as Lyuba, Children and the Factory in 2005. A Polish adaptation, Hela w opałach (Hela Under Fire; Hela is short form from Helen), aired on TVN in September 2006.

Also there is another Russian adaptation as Ольга (Olga). The show premiered on TNT on September 5, 2016.

References

External links
 Grace Under Fire @ Carsey-Werner.net
 Carsey-Werner – Grace Under Fire
 
 Polish version official website (Polish)
 Fame, Fire and Surrender: Interview with Brett Butler

1990s American sitcoms
1993 American television series debuts
1998 American television series endings
American Broadcasting Company original programming
English-language television shows
Television franchises
Television series about divorce
Television series about families
Television series by Carsey-Werner Productions
Television shows set in Missouri
Television series created by Chuck Lorre
Alcohol abuse in television
Mass media portrayals of the working class